Alvaro Alonso Barba was a secular Catholic priest and metallurgist born in Lepe in 1569.

Antonio (1786) says, "Baeticus ex oppido Lepe, apud Potosi"; hence Barba is assumed to be of Andalusian origin, from the ancient Roman province of Baetica. 

He lived at Potosí during the period when its silver mines were most productive and luxury among the Spanish residents and mine owners had nearly reached its height. Father Barba divided his time between his priestly duties and a close study of the ores of this region and their treatment. There had been, since 1570, a complete revolution in the treatment of silver ores, through the application of mercury, and a number of improvements followed, of which Barba had knowledge. 

In 1609, he invented the pan amalgamation process (in Spanish the cazo or fondo process) for extracting silver from ore by mixing it with salt and mercury and heating it in shallow copper vessels. In 1640 he published in Madrid a book entitled Arte de los Metales, the earliest work on South American ores and minerals. It includes information on mineral localities in Bolivia. The book has been republished in Spanish, French, English and German.

Notes

References
Nicolas Antonio, Bibliotheca hispana nova (A Library of New Spain; Madrid, 1786)
Attribution
 Cites:
Pinelo, Epitome, etc., (1738), II;
Nicolas Antonio, Bibliotheca hispana nova (Madrid, 1786);
Mendiburu, Dicc. Hist. -biog., etc., (Lima, 1876), II;
Relaciones geograficas de Indias (Madrid, 1885), II, Appendix iv.

External links

Metallurgists
Year of birth unknown
Year of death unknown